The winged lion is a mythological creature that resembles a lion with bird-like wings.

Mythical adaptations
The winged lion is found in various forms especially in ancient and medieval civilizations.

There were different mythological adaptions for the winged lion:

 Lamassu or shedu in Mesopotamian mythology was depicted as a winged lion. It was often depicted with a bull's body instead of a lion's body.
 The griffin in classical mythology was depicted as a lion-eagle creature. Griffin-like creatures were depicted in Egyptian and Persian mythology.
 The first beast in the first vision of the biblical prophet Daniel resembled a winged lion.
 The winged lion was the heraldic symbol of Mark the Evangelist.
 The Goetic demon Vapula was depicted as a winged lion.

Emblems

The emblems of the winged lions were featured in different countries:

 The emblem of the Republic of Venice as the heraldic symbol of St. Mark the Evangelist, the patron saint of the Republic.
 The Lion of Venice is an ancient bronze sculpture of a winged lion that is located in the Piazzetta di San Marco, Venice
 The flag of the short-lived Septinsular Republic, derived from the above (Ionian Islands under Venetian rule), has a winged lion on it
 The logo of the Italian company Assicurazioni Generali which has a winged lion on it was derived from the above
 The emblem of the North Atlantic Treaty Organization (NATO) Allied Joint Force Command Naples headquarters, in Italy, is a winged lion holding a sword and scroll on which is written  - Latin for 'peace'.

Gallery

See also

 Aq Bars
 Chimera
 Griffin
 Lamassu
 Manticore
 Merlion
 Nemean lion
 Sea-lion
 Sphinx
 Winged cat

References

External links

Lions in heraldry
Mythological lions
Mythological hybrids
Mythological felines